The 1896 Geneva Covenanters football team was an American football team that represented Geneva College as an independent during the 1896 college football season. Led by William McCracken in his seventh and final year as head coach, Geneva compiled a record of 0–5.

Schedule

References

Geneva
Geneva Golden Tornadoes football seasons
Geneva Covenanters football